Edward Joseph Klep (October 12, 1918 – November 21, 1981) was born in Erie, Pennsylvania.  Most notably, Klep became the first white American to play baseball in the Negro leagues when he pitched three innings for the Cleveland Buckeyes on May 29, 1946, in a loss against the Chicago American Giants in Grand Rapids, Michigan.

Klep was featured on the cover and in a feature article in the Spring 2002 issue of Elysian Fields Quarterly.

Notes

References
Jonathan Tilove, "A Robinson in Reverse, Eddie Klep Integrated the Negro Leagues", Newhouse News Service, March 5, 2005, retrieved October 22, 2006.

External links
Career statistics and player information Seamheads

1918 births
1981 deaths
Cleveland Buckeyes players
Sportspeople from Erie, Pennsylvania
Baseball players from Pennsylvania